The Voi shrew (Crocidura voi) is a species of mammal in the family Soricidae. It is found in Benin, Burkina Faso, Cameroon, Central African Republic, Chad, Ethiopia, Ghana, Kenya, Mali, Niger, Nigeria, Somalia, Sudan, and Togo. Its natural habitat is dry savanna.

References
 Hutterer, R. 2004.  Crocidura voi.   2006 IUCN Red List of Threatened Species.   Downloaded on 30 July 2007.

Crocidura
Mammals described in 1910
Taxonomy articles created by Polbot